Stade Français Basket is the basketball section of French multi-sports club Stade Français, which is based in Paris. The club was established in 1920, and it currently has 23 teams competing in different categories, with the main two being women's teams, in the national championships of France.

Men's basketball
The men's teams currently include Under-20, Under-17, Under-15 and Under-13 divisions, which compete in regional championships.

Titles
 Ligue Nationale
 1921, 1927

Men's players

Men's head coaches

Women's basketball
The club's women's teams have the most significant achievements for the club, as they won six French national championships in the 1980s, including five titles in a row. They were also a regular participant in the Euroleague Women. In 1985, the club moved to nearby Versailles, competing as "Union Stade Français Versailles", until it was disestablished in 1989.

Titles
 Ligue Nationale
 1980, 1983, 1984, 1985, 1986, 1987
 Coupe de France
 1982, 1983, 1985

See also
 Stade Français football
 Stade Français rugby

References

External links
 Official website

Stade Français
Basketball teams established in 1920
Women's basketball teams in France